Hon. Stedman Rawlins (c.1784–1830) was a slaveholder and sugar plantation owner, and the President of His Majesty's Council, on the Caribbean island of St. Christopher.

Life
Stedman was born in the Caribbean and baptized at Trinity Anglican Church, Trinity Palmetto Point Parish. He became a profitable slave owner in Saint Thomas Middle Island Parish, just as his father, Stedman Rawlins Sr. (b.1749), had been. The French used one of the Rawlins Sr. plantations to bomb British fortifications on Brimstone Hill during the American Revolution. Rawlins Jr. married Gertrude Tyson circa 1805. England outlawed the slave trade in 1807.

Rawlins became the Governor of Saint Christopher in 1816.  He owned the Verchild's and the Crab Hole plantations.  Rawlins was one of the magistrates that ruled against slave Betto Douglas's complaint of cruelty, returning her to her master after he had kept her in stocks for 7 months in 1826. Rawlins was the President of His Majesty's Council on St. Christopher. Missionary accounts indicate that he encouraged missionaries to preach to the slaves in the President's hall.  In 1827, Rawlins became the acting Governor of St. Kitts. He was charged with the selling of criminal slaves, even after the slave trade had been abolished.

He went to Halifax, Nova Scotia and died there, being buried in the Old Burying Ground in 1830. Rawlins's obituary reads that he was at St. Christopher, "where he was much respected.  He had recently come to this country [Nova Scotia] in the hope of restoring his constitution, debilitated by a long residence in the West Indies."

Three  years later, the Slavery Abolition Act of 1833 outlawed slavery all together in the British empire.

See also 
 Slavery in the British and French Caribbean
 List of slave owners

References

Other readings 
 Dyde B 2005, 'Out of the Crowded Vagueness: A History of the Islands of St Kitts, Nevis and Anguilla', Macmillan Caribbean, Oxford.
 Hubbard VK 2002 'A History of St Kitts: the Sweet Trade', Oxford.

History of Nova Scotia
1830 births
1884 deaths
People from Trinity Palmetto Point Parish
People from Saint Thomas Middle Island Parish